Ahmed Hararah (Egyptian Arabic: "أحمد محمد علي البلاسي "حرارة, born February 11, 1980) is an Egyptian political activist who was blinded in both eyes in separate protesting incidents during the 2011 Egyptian Revolution. He lost his first eye to Police gunshots on 28 January (also known as the Friday of Wrath), and his second eye also to police gunshots during the events of Mohamed Mahmoud on 19 November of the same year. The nickname "Hararah" means heat and zeal. Hararah continued his activism for several years following the revolution. Among his most famous actions was forming the polity party Dostor, along with other prominent figures including Dr. Mohamed El-Baradie. Hararah was also a prominent figure in modifying the articles in the Egyptian Constitution that guarantee the rights of disabled people. He used his fame to advocate for many crucial political and human rights issues at the time.
After losing his career as a dentist, Hararah decided to pursue his studies in a different field and has already obtained a Master's degree in Social Policy from LSE University in London and is currently pursuing his second Master's degree in Middle East Issues with the AUC University in Cairo. He also works as a part time researcher. Hararah is married and currently lives in Cairo.

About 
The former dentist became a symbol of the 25 January Revolution in which protestors called for the removal of President Hosni Mubarak. He initially decided to join the Revolution to protest against police brutality against the poor and the weak in Egypt and continued to call for the slogans of the Revolution ‘bread, freedom, and social justice’. Hararah was named the Person of the Year 2011 in the Times Magazine and interviewed widely during the years following the Revolution.

Injuries 
Hararah sustained injuries that left him blind.

Right eye
On January 28, 2011, known as the Friday of Wrath, protesters clashed with police on the Qasr El Nile Bridge. Hararah felt it was the first day all of Egypt showed up. Hararah was shot in the face with a shotgun and after three days in a coma woke up in hospital. The gunshot's pelts caused 64 lacerations to his head, 4 caused his right eye’s retina to completely burn, 6 were sustained to his neck, and 4 had injured his lungs.None of the pelts were removed.

Left eye
On November 19, 2011 Hararah was shot a second time while demonstrating on Mohamed Mahmoud St. near Tahrir Square, but this shotgun was loaded with one large pellet, which hit him directly in the left eye, resulting in total blindness.

References

External links
Ahmed Harara: One year after the "25 January Revolution"
Ahmed Harara on Twitter
Isquat al-Nizam Wiki Page

1980 births
Living people
Egyptian activists
Egyptian revolutionaries
People of the Egyptian revolution of 2011
Place of birth missing (living people)
Egyptian blind people